Ari Guðmundsson (14 September 1927 – 6 September 2003) was an Icelandic swimmer and ski jumper who competed in the 1940s and 1950s. He competed in two freestyle swimming events at the 1948 Summer Olympics. He finished 35th in the individual large hill event at the 1952 Winter Olympics in Oslo.

See also
 List of athletes who competed in both the Summer and Winter Olympic games

References

External links
1924-56 Winter Olympic ski jumping results

1927 births
2003 deaths
Ski jumpers at the 1952 Winter Olympics
Ari Gudmundsson

Ari Gudmundsson

Ari Gudmundsson
Ari Gudmundsson
Swimmers at the 1948 Summer Olympics
20th-century Icelandic people